The Strathmore Group is a Devonian lithostratigraphic group (a sequence of  rock strata) in central Scotland. Its sandstones are interbedded with siltstones which interfinger with conglomerates. It is encountered from Arran in the west across the Midland Valley to Stonehaven in the east. The name is derived from Strathmore, Angus where this sequence occupies the axis of the Strathmore Syncline which runs for many tens of miles parallel to and south of the Highland Boundary Fault. The rocks of the Strathmore Group have also previously been referred to as the Strathmore Beds.

References

 

Devonian System of Europe
Geology of Scotland
Geological groups of the United Kingdom
Geologic formations of the United Kingdom